"Milk and honey" is a phrase from Exodus (Exodus 3:8) referring to the Promised Land of Judaism as "a land flowing with milk and honey".

Milk and Honey may also refer to:

Music
 The Milk and Honey Band, an English band
 Milk and Honey (album), a 1984 album by John Lennon and Yoko Ono
 Milk & Honey (Crowder album), 2021
 Milk & Honey (German group), German musical duo consisting of Anne Ross and Manel Filali
 Milk and Honey (Israeli group), Israeli band that won the Eurovision Song Contest
 "Milk and Honey", a song by Jackson C. Frank from the 1965 album Jackson C. Frank
 "Milk & Honey", a song by Beck from the 1999 album Midnite Vultures
 “Milkshake ‘n Honey”, a song by Sleater-Kinney from the 2000 album All Hands on the Bad One
 "Milk & Honey", a song by As Tall as Lions from the 2006 album As Tall as Lions
 "Milk & Honey", a song by Clinic from the 2010 album Bubblegum
 "Milk and Honey", a song by Delain from the 2012 album We Are the Others
 "Milk & Honey", a song by Arcade Fire created for the score to the 2013 film Her
 "Milk n' Honey", a song by Anderson .Paak featuring Tray Samuels from the 2014 album Venice
 "Milk & Honey", a song by Billie Marten from the 2016 album Writing of Blues and Yellows
 "Milk and Honey", by Hollie Cook, from the compilation album Saint-Germain-des-Prés Café: The Must-Have Cool Tempo Selection by Bart & Baker

Other uses
 Milk & Honey (bar), a members' cocktail bar in London and New York
 Milk and Honey (film), a Canadian film released in 1988
 Milk and Honey (musical), a 1961 Broadway musical by Jerry Herman and Don Appell
 Milk and Honey (novel), a novel by Faye Kellerman
 The Milk & Honey Distillery, a Single-Malt Whisky distillery located in Israel
 Milk and Honey (poetry collection), a 2015 collection by the Canadian poet Rupi Kaur

See also
 Land of Milk and Honey, a 1971 documentary film by Pierre Étaix
 Scaphism, an execution method which includes the victim being fed milk and honey